Altschul or Altshul is a Jewish surname of Ashkenazi origin. It is derived from the Altschul, Old Synagogue in Prague.

Altschul is the surname of

Andrew Foster Altschul, American novelist
Annie Altschul (1919–2001), British nursing administrator
Arthur Altschul (1920–2002), American banker
Barry Altschul (born 1943), American jazz drummer
Frank Altschul (1887-1981), American banker
Louis V. Arco (born Lutz Altschul, 1899–1975), Austrian-born American actor
Patricia Altschul (born 1941), American socialite, art collector, and television personality
Randi Altschul (born 1960), American inventor
Serena Altschul (born 1970), American broadcast journalist
Stephen Altschul (born 1957), American mathematician

Altshul is the surname of

 Elena Altshul (also spelled Altsjoel or Altchoul; born 1964), Soviet draughts player, women's world draughts champion

See also
 
 Siri von Reis (born 1931), American botanist, author and poet, whose standard botanical abbreviation is Altschul
 Altschuler (and variants), surname

References

German-language surnames
Yiddish-language surnames

de:Altschul